Proterocosma is a genus of moths in the family Agonoxenidae. It was formerly included in the Cosmopterigidae.

Species
Proterocosma dualis Diakonoff, 1954
Proterocosma epizona Meyrick, 1886
Proterocosma marginata Diakonoff, 1954
Proterocosma ochronota Meyrick, 1886
Proterocosma triplanetis Meyrick, 1886

References
Natural History Museum Lepidoptera genus database

Agonoxeninae
Moth genera